La Plataforma per la Llengua (the Pro-Language Platform) is a non-governmental organisation born in 1993 in Barcelona, in order to defend and promote the Catalan language all over the Catalan-speaking territories in the European states where it is spoken: Spain, France, Andorra and Italy. Their activities include the development of sociolinguistic studies and a constant monitoring on the status of Catalan, in collaboration with other organizations, foundations and public agencies. While based in Barcelona, it has delegations in Valencian Community, Alghero and in several Catalan regions. Moreover,  La Plataforma per la Llengua works together with some Northern Catalonia, La Franja, Andorra and Balearic Islands organisations. There are many aims; one of them is to guarantee the linguistic rights of Catalan-speaking people and the use of Catalan as a connexion tool in the fields and territories where it is spoken.

As of 2022, there were 25,000 associates, more than 55,000 followers on Facebook and more than 66,000 followers on Twitter. Also, every six months, the NGO publishes a magazine called Corbella whose print run is 9,000 copies. In 2008, this magazine was awarded a prize for being the best cultural association media. The prize was awarded by the Federació d’Ateneus de Catalunya.

The Association is supported by a consultative council consisting of Salvador Cardús, Jordi Font, Josep M. López Llaví, Albert Manent, Isidor Marí, Fèlix Martí, Jordi Porta, Jordi Sànchez, Josep Mª Terricabras, Miquel Sellarès, Vicenç Villatoro, Isabel-Clara Simó, Miquel Strubell, Patrícia Gabancho and Abelard Saragossà.

On 23 September 2012, Martí Gasull i Roig, one of the organisation's founders and the main Plataforma per la Llengua coordinator, died in an accident on a mountain (Manaslu), in Nepal. Martí Gasull i Roig work's has been appreciated many times. On 9 October 2012, Generalitat de Catalunya awarded him the posthumous title of Creu de Sant Jordi. Among posthumous prizes there are: Premi d’Obra Cultural Balear Aina Moll i Marquès a la nit de la Cultura 2012, 'El Segador de l'any' by Reagrupament, UEC and Gràcia and Barcelona local government plens municipals recognition  and the Barcelona local government Medalla d'Or al Mèrit Cultural. On 15 January 2013, Plataforma per la Llengua honoured Martí Gasull Roig in the Sala Gran del Teatre Nacional de Catalunya, in Barcelona. It approved the Premi Martí Gasull i Roig basis in order to award a person or an organisation that has highlighted in the defence of Catalan language once a year.

Mission of the Organisation
This is the mission as defined by the organisation:

 Articulate Catalan as the common language of social cohesion and of interrelationship between all the people of the linguistic area.
 Guarantee and promote the use of the Catalan language in all these areas.
 Promote the linguistic and cultural rights of the persons who speak Catalan and of those who live to the territories of Catalan speech, with regard to this language.
 Stimulate and collaborate in campaigns of linguistic normalization of the Catalan language.
 Address problems that affect the Catalan society, always and especially when they contribute to the improvement of the use of Catalan. The Association wishes to represent Catalan civil society and to reactivate this society in the world of the linguistic activism.

Action areas
 Linguistic reception. Catalan language promotion as an inclusion tool to immigrants and people who don't speak Catalan.
 Public Administration. Campaigns to get legal and political Catalan recognition, specially in order to become Catalan in an official state language and European Union official language. 
 Culture and audiovisual. Campaigns in favour of the cinema and the media in Catalan.
 Learning and university. Campaigns to encourage Catalan learning and the right to learn in at School.
 Business and consumption. Defend the consumer rights to get products and services in Catalan
 Games and spare time. Campaigns for children and teenagers to get products and services in Catalan. 
 Place names. Catalan place names standardisation in indications, documents and web pages. 
 Linguistic consciousness. Sensitivity campaigns about linguistic rights.

History

La Plataforma per la Llengua was born in 1993. His first public action was collecting 18,000 Coca-Cola tins, which was a score, in Plaça de Catalunya, in Barcelona, 12 December 1993. The goal was asking for Catalan business tagging. A draw that said "Etiquetem en català" (Let's tag in Catalan) was made with all the collected tins. Since then, some more campaigns took place in tagging area, cinema and in the Catalan recognition.

Between 1995 and 2000 some protestation acts took place in cinemas to ask for dubbing and Catalan subtitling. Also, there were campaigns to pressure the government and the multinationals with massive messages, certificates and public reports to media. In 2001, relevant multinationals like Warner made films in Catalan about the Story of Harry Potter. In 2011, La Plataforma per la Llengua made Catalan government write a cinema law that guarantee 50% of copies in Catalan. However, in 2013 it hasn't been yet enforced. In 1997, La Plataforma per la Llengua played a relevant role in the discussion of other laws filed by the Generalitat de Catalunya, like the Act on linguistic policy, the Statute of Autonomy of Catalonia 2006, the Act on reception for immigrants and returnees to Catalonia 2010 or Catalan Consumer Code 2010. Some small changes were made in the documents that involved Catalan language, but most of them haven't been yet applied.

In business area, there was a very unfavourable situation in 2000, and by intensive campaigns, some goals were achieved: Catalan language was introduced in some big multinationals like Apple, Microsoft, Vodafone, Orange, Telefónica, Carrefour, Nokia, Samsung, Siemens, Carrefour, Decathlon, Schlecker, Facebook, Google, Twitter or IKEA.

From 2000 La Plataforma per la Llengua started growing. Before, it was an organisation supported by Col•lectiu l’Esbarzer, but then, an associates basis and a professional structured were created. A new work methodology was applied, reports were written and a consumer net appear. Some events were organised in order to make citizens realise about the linguistic points and claim a business improvement as well as an autonomic government improvement of Catalonia, Valencian Community, Aragon and Balearic Islands and Spanish, French and Italian States.
    
In 2004, the first Festa de la Joguina en Català (The Game Party in Catalan) was celebrated some days before Christmas. Since then, it has been celebrated once a year to claim children can play in Catalan. In 2005, the first Festa d’Acollida d’Estudiants Universitaris Erasmus (Welcome party for university students with Erasmus Programme) in Barcelona to increase Catalan language in university courses and make new arrival students use Catalan in university courses. In 2005, the first Dia de Sant Jordi act (Saint George's Day), Catalonia's patron, was celebrated in Plaça de Catalunya, in Barcelona, with other immigrants organisations to reclaim the use of Catalan as a common language. Since then, the organisation has worked together with a 30 immigrant organisations to established the linguistic diversity of Catalan Community and the use of Catalan as a cohesion tool, by using a hundred linguistic partners formed by a Catalan and a person who wants to learn it, and by videos about social cohesion in Catalan that have had a thousand visitors.

La Plataforma per la Llengua put into groups a hundred local governments and Catalan institutions that had the compromise to use only the products tagged in Catalan. After having achieved tagging in Catalan in the products like wine, cava, water, milk and beer, finally, after strong campaigns towards the government, in 2010, the Catalan Consumer Code 2010 comprised the obligation of tagging in Catalan the products distributed in Catalonia.

La Plataforma per la Llengua has complained again by campaigns that Catalan is the only European language with so many million speakers that is neither official of European Union nor of a state of European Union. In 2009 a report was written, it complained more than 500 actions that Catalan people need to use Spanish Language and the valid Catalan banning in Spain.

La Plataforma per la Llengua has acted to answer to the Government of Spain attacks and to the some other Spanish Autonomic Government attacks. These attacks were against people who spoke Catalan, specially, in learning and against the recognition of the official language too. Complaints about failure to take action and about Spanish police aggressions, as well as the aggressions of other civil servants against citizens that express themselves in Catalan.

Acknowledgements
Throughout 20 years, this organization has received several awards, including the 2008 National Prize for Culture for the social projection of the Catalan language, given by the Government of Catalonia: Generalitat de Catalunya; Premi Abacus, awarded in 2010;  Premi de Voluntariat, in  2008, 2010 and 2012, and Premi al millor projecte associatiu del Consell Nacional de la Joventut de Catalunya, awarded in 2012.

References

External links 

 Plataforma per la Llengua 

Catalan advocacy organizations
Language policy in Spain